Dexter Lavista Daniels (December 8, 1973) is an American former college and professional football player who was a linebacker in the National Football League (NFL) for a single season in .  Daniels played college football for the University of Florida, and thereafter, he played professionally for the Baltimore Ravens of the NFL.

Early years 

Daniels was born in Valdosta, Georgia in 1973.  He attended Valdosta High School, where he played high school football for the Valdosta Wildcats and was named USA Today Defensive High School Player of the Year in 1991.

College career 

Daniels accepted an athletic scholarship to attend the University of Florida in Gainesville, Florida, and he played for the Florida Gators football team under coach Steve Spurrier from 1992 to 1995.  The Gators won Southeastern Conference (SEC) championships in 1993 and 1994, and finished the 1995 regular season as the 12–0 SEC champions, but were ultimately defeated 62–24 by the Nebraska Cornhuskers in the Fiesta Bowl for the Bowl Alliance national championship.  Daniels was a first-team All-SEC selection after his senior season in 1995.

Daniels graduated from the University of Florida with a bachelor's degree in criminal justice in 1997.

Professional career 

The Baltimore Ravens selected Daniels in the sixth round (172nd pick overall) of the 1996 NFL Draft, and he played in four games for the Ravens during their inaugural  season in Baltimore.

See also 

 Florida Gators
 Florida Gators football, 1990–99
 History of the Baltimore Ravens
 List of Florida Gators in the NFL Draft
 List of University of Florida alumni

References

Bibliography 

 Carlson, Norm, University of Florida Football Vault: The History of the Florida Gators, Whitman Publishing, LLC, Atlanta, Georgia (2007).  .
 Golenbock, Peter, Go Gators!  An Oral History of Florida's Pursuit of Gridiron Glory, Legends Publishing, LLC, St. Petersburg, Florida (2002).  .
 Hairston, Jack, Tales from the Gator Swamp: A Collection of the Greatest Gator Stories Ever Told, Sports Publishing, LLC, Champaign, Illinois (2002).  .
 McCarthy, Kevin M.,  Fightin' Gators: A History of University of Florida Football, Arcadia Publishing, Mount Pleasant, South Carolina (2000).  .
 Nash, Noel, ed., The Gainesville Sun Presents The Greatest Moments in Florida Gators Football, Sports Publishing, Inc., Champaign, Illinois (1998).  .

1973 births
Living people
People from Valdosta, Georgia
Players of American football from Georgia (U.S. state)
American football linebackers
Florida Gators football players
Baltimore Ravens players